Ancient India was one of the most important seat of Astronomical studies. There were many scholars, philosophers and astronomers in ancient India, who wrote treatises on experimental and mathematical astronomy. Most of the Ancient Indian Astronomical Treatises were written and composed in Sanskrit language.

List of the Astronomical Treatises 

 Vedanga Jyotisha
 Aryabhatiya
 Brahmasphuta-siddhanta
 Pañcasiddhāntikā
 Mahabhaskariya
 Laghubhaskariya
 Aryabhatiyabhashya
 Śisyadhīvrddhida
 Siddhāntatilaka
 Siddhāntaśiromani
 Karanakutūhala
 Siddhāntaśekhara
 Yantra-rāja
 Aryabhatiyabhashya
 Jyotirmimamsa
 Sphutanirnaya
 Karanottama
 Uparāgakriyākrama
 Śiṣyadhīvṛddhidatantra
 Brihat-Samhita
 Grahana-Maala
 Lilavati
 Shatapatha Brahmana

References 

Astronomy
Astronomy articles by importance
Astronomy books
Indian
Astronomy in India
Astronomy data and publications